Heine is a crater on Mercury. It has a diameter of 73 kilometers. Its name was adopted by the International Astronomical Union (IAU) in 1979. Heine is named for the German poet Heinrich Heine, who lived from 1797 to 1856.

Heine crater is to the southeast of the prominent Degas crater, and is overlain by rays and secondary craters from Degas.  Heine is on the southwestern margin of Sobkou Planitia.

References

Impact craters on Mercury